National Highway 132B, commonly referred to as NH 132B is a national highway in India. It is a secondary route of National Highway 32.  NH-132B runs in the state of Tamil Nadu in India.

Route 
NH132B connects Chengalpattu and Kanchipuram in the state of Tamil Nadu.

Junctions  

  Terminal near Chengalpattu.
  Terminal near Kanchipuram.

See also 
 List of National Highways in India
 List of National Highways in India by state

References

External links 
 NH 132B on OpenStreetMap

National highways in India
National Highways in Tamil Nadu